Davidi may refer to:

People 
 Aharon Davidi (1927–2012), Israeli general
 Alon Davidi (born 1973), Israeli politician
 Efraim Davidi (born 1959), Israeli former professional footballer
 Guy Davidi (born 1978), Israeli documentary and filmmaker
 Udi Davidi (born 1975), Israeli singer, musician, lyricist and composer
 Uriel Davidi (1922–2006), Jewish religious leader and theologian
 Davidi Kitai (born 1979), Belgian professional poker player

Animals 
 Neocaridina davidi, freshwater shrimp originating from eastern China
 Parabraxas davidi, Chinese moth
 Elaphe davidi, Asian snake
 Forficula davidi, earwig
 Xenocypris davidi, Chinese fish
 Amphipneustes davidi, sea urchin
 Catocala davidi, moth
 Ichthyophis davidi, caecilian
 Ciuciulea davidi, whale
 Tarachodes davidi, praying mantis
 Harpalus davidi, beetle
 Scythris davidi, moth

See also 
 David (name)

Masculine given names
Hebrew-language surnames